A list of songs recorded by English musician Morrissey.

List

Notes

References

Morrissey